Battlefish is an American reality television show that follows the pursuits of several fishing boats as they search the Pacific Ocean for albacore tuna. The eight-episode first season debuted on Netflix on September 21, 2018. The show is produced by Pilgrim Media Group.

The series documents five fishing crews along the coasts of Washington and Oregon during the 2017 fishing season.

Episodes

References

External links 
 
 

English-language Netflix original programming
2018 American television series debuts
2010s American reality television series
Fishing television series